Alimamy Rassin (1825-1890) was a Fula chief from Sierra Leone who devoted his life to making peace among his people and fellow rulers.

Biography
Alimamy Rassin was born in 1825 in Mafonda, now Sanda Magbolonto Chiefdom, in the Northern Province of Sierra Leone to a Fula father from Senegal and a Temne mother. When his father returned to Senegal, Rassin was adopted by Alimamy Amadu, a Fula chief of Mafonda Chiefdom, and given the best Muslim education available in his days. Rassin was an amazingly gifted student, and his intellectual achievements made him famous throughout northern Sierra Leone while still a young boy. When his Fula family came from Senegal to claim him, Chief Amadu, who now regarded Rassin as his son, refused to give him up.

When Alimamy Amadu died in 1845, the people of Mafonda chose Rassin as their chief. But Rassin was a modest man and refused to be crowned officially for several years.

From the outset of his rule, Alimamy Rassin made clear his hatred of war and all forms of violence. He set up a fund for the promotion of peace to be replenished from fines levied in the chief's court. He mediated successfully in political disputes in the Sanda Tendaren, Tonko, and Yoni chiefdom; occasionally sending his sons on official peace missions. When the Mandinka army of Samori Toure reached Mafonda in 1885, and occupy many areas of northern Sierra Leone. The invaders were so impressed by Rassin's wise rule that they chose to withdraw and leave Mafonda in peace. The British administration in Freetown was equally impressed with Alimamy Rassin's rule and offered him a large annual stipend to continue with his efforts to establish peace among the interior rulers. But Rassin rejected the offer, arguing that it was unethical to accept payment for the promotion of peace. He ruled wisely for the benefit of his people and not for political favours from the British. Alimamy Rassin died in 1890, six years before the chiefs lost their independence to British rule.

External links
 https://web.archive.org/web/20060222005607/http://www.sierra-leone.org/heroes4.html

1825 births
1890 deaths
Sierra Leonean Fula people